Yinggen is a town and the seat of Qiongzhong Li and Miao Autonomous County in the centre of Hainan. , it had 5 residential communities and 16 villages under its administration. The Baihuashan Waterfall is located nearby.

See also 
 List of township-level divisions of Hainan

References 

Township-level divisions of Hainan
Qiongzhong Li and Miao Autonomous County
County seats in Hainan